The Philadelphia Wings are a lacrosse team based in Philadelphia, Pennsylvania playing in the National Lacrosse League (NLL). The 2019-2020 season is their 2nd season in the NLL. Due to the COVID-19 pandemic in Philadelphia, the season was suspended on March 12, 2020. On April 8, the league made a further public statement announcing the cancellation of the remaining games of the 2020 season and that they would be exploring options for playoffs once it was safe to resume play.

On June 4th, the league confirmed that the playoffs would also be cancelled due to the pandemic.

Regular season

Final standings

Game log

Cancelled games

Roster

Entry Draft
The 2019 NLL Entry Draft took place on September 17, 2019. The Wings made the following selections:

References

Philadelphia
Philadelphia Wings seasons
Philadelphia Wings